Andrea Dallavalle (born 31 October 1999) is an Italian male triple jumper. He competed at the 2020 Summer Olympics, in Triple jump.

Biography
On July 23, 2017, winning the silver medal at the 2017 European Athletics U20 Championships, with a measure of 16.87 m has also sets the standard entry, established at 16.80 m, of access to the 2017 World Championships in Athletics. This measure also allows him to place himself in the 31st place in the top IAAF world-leading list, which is however the 25th measure considering that every nation can participate in world championships with up to three athletes.

Personal best
Triple jump: 17.35 m (+1.7 m/s;  Grosseto, 12 June 2021)
Long jump: 7.57 m (+0.3 m/s;  Reggio Emilia, 17 September 2017)

Achievements

See also
 Italian all-time lists - Triple jump

References

External links

1999 births
Living people
Italian male triple jumpers
Athletics competitors of Fiamme Gialle
Athletes (track and field) at the 2020 Summer Olympics
World Athletics Championships athletes for Italy
Italian Athletics Championships winners
Olympic athletes of Italy
European Athletics Championships medalists